Benoît Mariage (born 19 July 1961) is a Belgian film director.

Filmography
2014: Les Rayures du zèbre
2007: Cow-boy
2003: L'autre
1999: Les convoyeurs attendent

Documentaries
2001:  Nemadis, the Years Without News
2011: On the road again, le cinéma de Bouli Lanners

Shorts
1990: Elvis
1997: The Signalman

External links
 

1961 births
Belgian film directors
Living people
Walloon people